Linda (Spanish for "Pretty") is a census-designated place (CDP) in Yuba County, California, United States. The population was 17,773 at the 2010 census, up from 13,474 at the 2000 census.

Geography

Climate
According to the Köppen Climate Classification system, Linda has a warm-summer Mediterranean climate, abbreviated "Csa" on climate maps.

History
The townsite was originally laid out in 1850 and originally called Olivehurst by John Rose at the furthest navigable point on the Yuba River, on the south bank above Marysville. The town at that site lasted only two years before moving to its present location. The original site is buried under tailings from hydraulic mining.

Demographics

2010
At the 2010 census Linda had a population of 17,773. The racial makeup of Linda was 9,973 (56.1%) White, 722 (4.1%) African American, 361 (2.0%) Native American, 2,304 (13.0%) Asian, 80 (0.5%) Pacific Islander, 3,029 (17.0%) from other races, and 1,304 (7.3%) from two or more races. Hispanic or Latino of any race were 5,779 persons (32.5%).

The census reported that 17,752 people (99.9% of the population) lived in households, 21 (0.1%) lived in non-institutionalized group quarters, and no one was institutionalized.

There were 5,440 households, 2,700 (49.6%) had children under the age of 18 living in them, 2,635 (48.4%) were opposite-sex married couples living together, 1,012 (18.6%) had a female householder with no husband present, 485 (8.9%) had a male householder with no wife present.  There were 542 (10.0%) unmarried opposite-sex partnerships, and 42 (0.8%) same-sex married couples or partnerships. 951 households (17.5%) were one person and 293 (5.4%) had someone living alone who was 65 or older. The average household size was 3.26.  There were 4,132 families (76.0% of households); the average family size was 3.67.

The age distribution was 5,929 people (33.4%) under the age of 18, 2,054 people (11.6%) aged 18 to 24, 4,937 people (27.8%) aged 25 to 44, 3,561 people (20.0%) aged 45 to 64, and 1,292 people (7.3%) who were 65 or older.  The median age was 27.9 years. For every 100 females, there were 100.1 males.  For every 100 females age 18 and over, there were 96.1 males.

There were 6,084 housing units at an average density of 711.9 per square mile, of the occupied units 2,670 (49.1%) were owner-occupied and 2,770 (50.9%) were rented. The homeowner vacancy rate was 4.3%; the rental vacancy rate was 9.5%.  8,453 people (47.6% of the population) lived in owner-occupied housing units and 9,299 people (52.3%) lived in rental housing units.

2000
At the 2000 census there were 13,474 people, 4,072 households, and 3,005 families in the CDP. The racial makeup of the CDP was 54.87% White, 3.14% African American, 2.90% Native American, 18.38% Asian, 0.21% Pacific Islander, 13.64% from other races, and 6.87% from two or more races. Hispanic or Latino of any race were 22.15%.

Of the 4,072 households 44.4% had children under the age of 18 living with them, 47.2% were married couples living together, 19.4% had a female householder with no husband present, and 26.2% were non-families. 19.1% of households were one person and 6.2% were one person aged 65 or older.  The average household size was 3.30 and the average family size was 3.80.

The age distribution was 37.4% under the age of 18, 11.6% from 18 to 24, 26.2% from 25 to 44, 17.0% from 45 to 64, and 7.8% 65 or older.  The median age was 26 years. For every 100 females, there were 100.4 males.  For every 100 females age 18 and over, there were 96.7 males.

The median household income was $22,753 and the median family income  was $24,925. Males had a median income of $25,513 versus $18,463 for females. The per capita income for the CDP was $9,826.  About 32.6% of families and 37.6% of the population were below the poverty line, including 47.2% of those under age 18 and 10.2% of those age 65 or over.

Media

MySYtv.com provides television coverage of local events in the area.

Government

References

External links
South Yuba County Live Weather and Scanner Feed
Edgewater Community Web Site

Census-designated places in Yuba County, California
Populated places established in 1850
Census-designated places in California
1850 establishments in California